Ours is an American-based rock band led by singer, songwriter, and multi-instrumentalist Jimmy Gnecco.

History

Harmony Bandits and Sour
Since their creation in 1990, the line-up has evolved many times, but Gnecco has always felt that having a rotating group of musicians who could play off each other was important. In high school, Gnecco was in the band Lost Child and later, The Harmony Bandits, which eventually evolved into what is now Ours. In 1994, Ours  released their first album titled Sour under their own label Beatnik Records, owned by Mike Marri. Afterwards, the band dissolved and did not reform again for several years.

Distorted Lullabies and Precious
In 1997, Gnecco restarted Ours again and quickly drew industry attention.  Ours signed with DreamWorks Records and after four years, released their first major label album Distorted Lullabies in 2001. Produced by Steve Lillywhite of U2 fame, the album received mixed reviews but led to successful tours with acts such as Ocean Colour Scene, Pete Yorn, and The Cult. The track "Sometimes" peaked at No. 31 on the US Billboard Modern Rock charts that year, while the music video saw moderate airtime on MTV.

Ours performed in Toronto at the Opera House in October, 2001. The album Precious followed soon after in 2002; Precious featured a more stripped-down sound and received much more positive reviews and led to a slot opening for The Wallflowers.

Dancing for the Death of an Imaginary Enemy
In 2004, Ours relocated from New Jersey to Los Angeles to work with Rick Rubin. The resulting album, Dancing for the Death of an Imaginary Enemy  was released on April 15, 2008.

The Heart
In 2010, Gnecco released his self-produced first solo acoustic effort, The Heart, and followed it in 2011 with the release of The Heart: X Edition, in which Gnecco built upon the intimacy of his solo album with a lush full band version of the record.

Ballet The Boxer 1
In 2012, Ours launched a PledgeMusic campaign to fund the recording of their new album, Ballet The Boxer 1. The band managed to reach 136% of the goal for their crowdfunding, and subsequently finished the album recording in 2013. Following a few setbacks, the album was eventually released on May 4 for those who participated in the crowdfunding, and a public release followed on June 11.

New Age Heroine 2 
In 2018, Ours released the album New Age Heroine II, which is the successor to Ballet The Boxer 1 in the trilogy started in 2013. The long-announced final chapter of the trilogy, originally planned to be titled "Spectacular Sight", will be released on May 15, 2021 (for the 20th anniversary of the first album - Distorted Lullabies). It will be a self-titled album.

Band members
Current members
 Jimmy Gnecco – lead vocals, guitars, piano, keyboards, drums, backing vocals... 
 April Bauer – piano, keyboards, backing vocals 
 Chris Iasiello - drums, backing vocals
 Mikey Iasiello - guitars, backing vocals
 Carmelo Risquet - Bass

Former members
 Static – guitar 
 Chris Goodlof - Bass
 Race – guitar/keys 
 Locke – keyboards 
 Dave Milone - guitar
 James Bray - Bass, guitar, keyboards
 Pit Gnecco – drums (tours only)
 Anthony De Marco - Keyboards

Tours
Ours has toured with The Wallflowers, Pete Yorn, Marilyn Manson, Blue October, Circa Survive, Plain Jane Automobile, Fear Before the March of Flames, The Dear Hunter, and Dear and the Headlights. They have also toured Europe with a-ha.

Discography

Studio albums
 Distorted Lullabies (2001)
 Precious (2002) 
 Mercy (Dancing for the Death of an Imaginary Enemy) (2008) 
 Ballet the Boxer 1 (2013)
 New Age Heroine II (2018)
 Ours (2021)

Extended plays
 Media Age (2020)
 The Bella Fall (2021)
 Right Here Right Now (2021)

Demo albums
 Sour (1994) (Demo album only and not recorded as Ours, but as Harmony Bandits)

Singles
 "Sometimes" (2001) No. 31 US Modern Rock
 "Drowning" (2001)
 "Leaves" (2002)
 "The Worst Things Beautiful" (2008)
 "Devil" (2013): The music video for this song has images originally shot for the unreleased short film 8 For Infinity. It was directed by Michael Maxxis and starred by Jimmy Gnecco and David Carradine.
 "Pretty Pain" (2019)
 "Slipping Away" (2019)
 "New Age Heroine" (2019)
 "Wounds of Love" (2019)
 "Don't Wanna Be A Star" (2020)

References

Interviews
 Jimmy Gnecco's Interview w/ The Scenestar - July 2007

External links
Official site for Ours
Official site for Jimmy Gnecco
MySpace
KillTheBand.com
IHeardYouSinging.com

Musical groups established in 1992
Alternative rock groups from New Jersey
American post-grunge musical groups